James W. Freeman House is a historic home and national historic district located near Wilton, Granville County, North Carolina.  It was built about 1820, and is a -story, three bay, heavy timber frame dwelling with Georgian / Federal style design elements.  It has a steeply pitched roof and an exterior brick end chimney.

It was listed on the National Register of Historic Places in 1988.

References

Houses on the National Register of Historic Places in North Carolina
Historic districts on the National Register of Historic Places in North Carolina
Georgian architecture in North Carolina
Federal architecture in North Carolina
Houses completed in 1820
Houses in Granville County, North Carolina
National Register of Historic Places in Granville County, North Carolina